Oregon Route 211 is a state highway which runs through part of the northeastern portion of Oregon's Willamette Valley. Its northeastern terminus is its intersection with U.S. Route 26 in Sandy, a small town on the outskirts of the Portland metro area. It runs south and west, through farmland and forest, to its southwestern terminus with OR 99E in Woodburn. After its intersection with OR 99E, a short segment (about 2 miles) of Oregon Route 214 connects OR 211 with Interstate 5.

A segment (about 5.5 miles) of OR 211 north of Estacada is shared with OR 224.

OR 211 comprises the Eagle Creek-Sandy Highway No. 172 (see Oregon highways and routes), part of the Clackamas Highway No. 171 (over the concurrency with OR 224), and the Woodburn-Estacada Highway No. 161.

Major intersections

References

211
Transportation in Marion County, Oregon
Transportation in Clackamas County, Oregon